Omega Race is a shoot 'em up arcade game designed by Ron Haliburton and released in 1981 by Midway. It is the only arcade game with vector graphics that Midway created.

Omega Race was ported to the VIC-20 and Commodore 64 and published by Commodore in 1982. In 1983, ColecoVision and Atari 2600 versions were released by CBS Electronics.

Gameplay
Set in the year 2003, the player controls an Omegan Fighter spaceship to destroy enemy droid ships in a rectangular "track." The player's ship is controlled with a spinner to rotate the ship, a button for thrusting, and a button for firing lasers. The enemies that the player must destroy or avoid are drone ships, commander ships, two types of space mines, and shooting star ships. The ship bounces off an invisible barrier on the edges of the screen that briefly appears when hit. By default, extra ships are awarded at 40,000 and 100,000 points.

Ports
The Atari 2600 cartridge came bundled with a "booster grip" controller which converted the single-button Atari CX40 joystick to having separate buttons for thrust and shoot. Omega Race is one of a few  CBS games for the Atari 2600 with an additional 256 bytes of RAM in each cartridge, a feature promoted by CBS as "RAM Plus."

Reception
Consumer Guides How To Win At Video Games stated in 1982 of Omega Race that "any unskilled player can pop a quarter into the machine and stay up there for up to 20,000 points."  According to the book, more than 35,000 machines were created, with the average machine taking in $181.00 per week at the time of the book's publication. Frequently, it was one of the top ten money-making arcade machines in any given week in that time period.

Compute! called Omega Race "a real winner for the VIC". BYTE stated that the VIC-20 version "is fast paced, has colorful graphics, and features good sound effects ... Omega Race is a fun game that retains all the best characteristics of the arcade version". Ahoy! called the VIC-20 version "fairly faithful to the arcade game, and very exciting". The VIC-20 version of Omega Race was awarded a Certificate of Merit in the category of "Best Solitaire Computer Game" at the 4th annual Arkie Awards.

Legacy 
Omega Race was cloned for the TRS-80 Color Computer as Space Race in 1982.

An update of the game for the Atari Jaguar was pitched to Atari Corporation by Temporary Sanity Designs, however, it never moved forward beyond the proposal phase and the document is in the hands of community member joekorali of AtariAge.

References

External links

1981 video games
Midway video games
Arcade video games
Atari 2600 games
Cancelled Atari Jaguar games
ColecoVision games
Commodore 64 games
VIC-20 games
Racing video games
Single-player video games
Shoot 'em ups
Vector arcade video games
Video games developed in the United States
Video games set in 2003
Video games set in outer space